Men's Slalom World Cup 1969/1970

Patrick Russel and Alain Penz shared the slalom title with maximum points, Jean-Noël Augert was third, and Henri Bréchu tied for fourth. All from France, these four won ten of the eleven slaloms; the other was taken by Gustav Thöni of Italy.

Final point standings
Points were only awarded for top ten finishes (see scoring system).

References
 fis-ski.com

Men's Slalom
FIS Alpine Ski World Cup slalom men's discipline titles